Arthur Henrys  (born 1870) was an English footballer. His regular position was at full back. He was born in Newcastle. He played for Manchester United, Notts Jardines, and Leicester Fosse.

External links
MUFCInfo.com profile

1870 births
English footballers
Manchester United F.C. players
Leicester City F.C. players
Year of death missing
Association football fullbacks